The Undercurrent is the fourth studio album by French band Scarve. This is their first studio album to not feature Guillaume Bideau, and the last to feature Pierrick Valence. Due to absence of Bideau the band hired ex-Darkane frontman Lawrence Mackory to do the clean vocals.

Track listing 
"Endangered" – 4:03
"Imperceptible Armageddon" – 4:31
"Senseless" – 2:35
"The Plundered" – 6:23
"Assuming Self" – 3:11
"Fathomless Descent" – 3:40
"A Few Scrap of Memories" – 5:51
"Rebirth" – 6:50
"Alteration" - 3:44 (re-recording from Luminiferous album)

Personnel 
Lawrence Mackrory – clean vocals
Pierrick Valence – harsh vocals
Sylvain Coudret – lead guitar
Patrick Martin – rhythm guitar
Loic Colin – bass
Dirk Verbeuren – drums

2008 albums
Scarve albums